Kulusuk Airport  is an airport in Kulusuk, a settlement on an island of the same name off the shore of the North Atlantic in the Sermersooq municipality in southeastern Greenland.

History
The airstrip was built by US defense in 1956, in order to support a Distant Early Warning Line station. The defense station was closed in 1991. Many remnants of the US military use of the field remain, including vehicles and plant used by the military to maintain the strip. Like some other airports in Greenland it was not built at a location suitable for civilian travel, i.e. not near the local major settlement. There are political discussions on building a new airport at Tasiilaq, a major settlement in the region, and to close the Kulusuk Airport.

During an operation in the early 1990's Kulusuk Airport was the base of operations for a team attempting to recover a US Air Force Lockheed P-38 Lightning from a glacier approximately 80 miles away. The aircraft was originally part of a flight of 6 P-38 and 2 B-17 bombers taking part in Operation Bolero during WW2. The team recovered a P-38 in 1992 and when rebuilt to flying condition the aircraft was named Glacier Girl. The story of Glacier Girl's recovery is displayed on the wall inside the departures hall.

Operations

Unlike the heliport in Tasiilaq on the nearby Ammassalik Island, the airport in Kulusuk can serve light and medium fixed wing aircraft, thus functioning as a mini-hub for Tasiilaq. The air strip is unsealed.

Given the increasing number of passengers travelling through the airport due to connections provided by Icelandair, both domestic to Nerlerit Inaat Airport and international to Iceland, the number of fixed-schedule helicopter flights to Tasiilaq is not sufficient to cover demand, due to a single Bell 212 helicopter of Air Greenland stationed at the airport.

Before Air Greenland took over Air Alpha, flights had been operated on-demand by two helicopters. The problem is acknowledged by Air Greenland, however the final decision regarding expansion belongs to the Government of Greenland.

Kulusuk Airport has, in cooperation with Icelandair, installed de-icing facilities since the winter 2014–2015. The terminal building hosts a small cafeteria, and a duty-free stand in the departures/arrivals hall. Accessible restrooms are available.

Access to the departures hall is limited due to the need to screen purchases at the duty-free. Passengers are only allowed to pass through the hall immediately before boarding, resulting in a lack of separation between arriving and departing passengers in the waiting check-in hall. Most arrivals and departures are synchronized in time to facilitate transfers between Icelandair passengers and Air Greenland passengers bound for Nuuk, Tasiilaq and Nerlerit Inaat Airport (and to several settlements in the area from there). The waiting hall is not sufficient to accommodate all passengers, resulting in a pre-boarding chaos.

Airlines and destinations

Accidents and incidents
On 2 July 1972, Douglas C-47B F-WSGU of Rousseau Aviation was damaged beyond economic repair in an accident.

On 20 April 1985, a problem was encountered with the additional fuel tanks that an Fokker F27 Friendship (registered YN-BZF) had been fitted with for the delivery flight to Aeronica from Europe to Managua, Nicaragua. Augusto C. Sandino International Airport. The pilots decided to return to Kulusuk Airport in Greenland, the place of their most recent fuel stop, but failed to do so. The aircraft crashed on a snow-covered strip, killing two of the five occupants.

References

External links

Official website

Airports in Greenland